Crutchley is a surname. Notable holders of this surname include:

 Lee Crutchley (born 1981), English author and illustrator
Bobby Crutchley (born 1970), English field hockey player and coach
Edward Crutchley (1922–1982), English cricketer
Ernest Crutchley (1878–1940), British civil servant 
Gerry Crutchley (1890–1969), English cricketer
John Brennan Crutchley (1946–2002), American murderer
Josh Crutchley (born 1987), British basketball player
Percy Crutchley (1855–1940), English cricketer
Ron Crutchley (1922–1987), English footballer
Rosalie Crutchley (1920–1997), English actress
Sir Victor Crutchley (1893–1986), Royal Navy admiral